Stuart James Nelson (born 17 September 1981) is an English professional footballer who plays as a goalkeeper for Dover Athletic.

Career
Born in Stroud, Gloucestershire, Nelson started his career at Cheltenham youth club FC Battledown. He also played for the Cirencester College Football Academy team, Millwall and Cirencester Town. County Cup success led to him being spotted by Northern Premier League side Hucknall Town after a spell with Doncaster Rovers.

Brentford 
Nelson joined Brentford from Hucknall in February 2004 for a fee of £10,000. He was sent off on his debut against Brighton & Hove Albion. He completed his first full season with Brentford in 2004–05, maintaining 21 clean sheets and helping the team into the promotion play-offs. He signed a new two-year contract in August 2005.

Nelson was appointed club captain for the 2006–07 season and scored the decisive penalty in a League Cup first round shootout win over Swindon Town. However, a ligament injury picked up in October meant that he was unable to play again until 2007. He returned and played 6 games towards the end of the season. He was released by Brentford on 16 May 2007.

Leyton Orient 
Nelson signed for Leyton Orient in summer 2007, but left less than a year later by mutual consent due to relocating issues. On 1 August 2008, Norwich City confirmed the signing of Nelson after he impressed Glenn Roeder while on trial at Carrow Road. He was released at the end of his one-year contract the following summer having made no first team appearances.

Aberdeen 
On 27 July 2009, Nelson signed a one-year contract with Scottish Premier League team Aberdeen. In May 2010 Nelson turned down an offer of a new contract.

Notts County 
On 23 June 2010, Nelson signed a two-year contract with League One team Notts County. Upon his signing for Notts County, he became the first choice goalkeeper; a position he retained in the 2011–12 season. However, on 9 May 2012, he was released by Notts County along with 12 of his teammates.

Gillingham 
On 20 July 2012, Nelson signed for Football League Two side Gillingham on a free transfer, on a two-year deal. He made his debut for Gillingham on 18 August 2012 against Bradford City. In his first season with the club Nelson won the League Two title and was runner up at the Player of the Season awards.

He received the club's player of the year award for the 2013–14 season. In May 2014, Nelson signed a new two-year contract, and in June 2016 signed a further two-year contract with the club. He was named Vice-Captain for the 2016–17 season. He made his 200th start for the team in December 2016. On 5 December 2017, Nelson made his 223rd competitive appearance for Gillingham which took him to 3rd on all time appearances for a goalkeeper for the club. Only Ron Hillyard (1st) and John Simpson (2nd) have played more times in goal for the club. The following month, however, Nelson left Gillingham having agreed the termination of his contract.

Yeovil Town 
On 20 February 2018, Nelson signed for League Two side Yeovil Town until the end of the season. He signed a new contract with Yeovil at the end of the 2017–18 season. He was released at the end of the 2019–20 season as a result of budget cuts.

Crawley Town 
On 7 November 2020, Nelson signed for League Two side Crawley Town on a three-month deal. On 12 January 2021, Nelson signed a contract extension to remain at the club until the end of the 2020-21 season.

Dorking Wanderers 
On 8 October 2021, Nelson signed for National League South side Dorking Wanderers. On 8 December 2021, it was confirmed that Nelson had left the club.

Sutton United 
On 15 January 2022, Nelson signed for League Two side Sutton United. Nelson was released at the end of the season having made two appearances for the club.

Dover Athletic
On 18 June 2022, Nelson agreed to join recently relegated National League South club Dover Athletic.

Personal life 
Nelson played rugby as a youngster and represented Gloucestershire.

Career statistics

Honours
Gillingham
Football League Two: 2012–13

Individual
PFA Team of the Year: 2012–13 League Two
Gillingham Player of the Season: 2013–14

References

External links

1981 births
Living people
People from Stroud
English footballers
Association football goalkeepers
Cirencester Town F.C. players
Millwall F.C. players
Doncaster Rovers F.C. players
Hucknall Town F.C. players
Brentford F.C. players
Leyton Orient F.C. players
Norwich City F.C. players
Aberdeen F.C. players
Notts County F.C. players
Gillingham F.C. players
Yeovil Town F.C. players
Crawley Town F.C. players
Dorking Wanderers F.C. players
Sutton United F.C. players
Dover Athletic F.C. players
English Football League players
National League (English football) players
Scottish Premier League players
Sportspeople from Gloucestershire